UFC Live: Hardy vs. Lytle (also known as UFC on Versus 5) was a mixed martial arts event held by the Ultimate Fighting Championship on August 14, 2011, at the Bradley Center in Milwaukee, Wisconsin. The event was the first that the UFC has hosted in Wisconsin. The event was broadcast on Rogers Sportsnet and Versus.

Background
Karlos Vemola was originally scheduled to face Stephan Bonnar in this event, but Bonnar was replaced by newcomer Ronny Markes after sustaining a training injury.

Paul Taylor was scheduled to face John Makdessi at this event, but Makdessi was forced from the bout with an injury and was replaced by Donald Cerrone.  In early July, Taylor had pulled out of his fight due to a broken foot and was replaced by Charles Oliveira.

Tom Lawlor was forced from his bout with Kyle Noke due to an injury during training, he was replaced by Ed Herman.

Leonard Garcia was expected to face Alex Caceres, but was forced out of the bout with an injury and replaced by newcomer Jimy Hettes.

UK viewers could watch the event for free on UFC TV or on Premier Sports in Great Britain.

At the weigh ins, Chris Lytle handed Dana White a thank-you letter and informed him that he will be retiring after this bout.

The UFC teamed up with Milwaukee's Harley-Davidson Museum, and Chris Lytle won a new 2012 Harley-Davidson Blackline motorcycle for winning the main event.

Nate Diaz was attended this fight.

Results

Bonus awards
Fighters were awarded $65,000 bonuses.

 Fight of the Night: Dan Hardy vs. Chris Lytle
 Knockout of the Night: Donald Cerrone
 Submission of the Night: Chris Lytle

Reported payout
The following is the reported payout to the fighters as reported to the Wisconsin's Department of Safety and Professional Services. It does not include sponsor money or "locker room" bonuses often given by the UFC and also do not include the UFC's traditional "fight night" bonuses.

Chris Lytle: $70,000 ($35,000 win bonus) def. Dan Hardy: $25,000
Ben Henderson: $34,000 ($17,000 win bonus) def. Jim Miller: $35,000
Donald Cerrone: $44,000 ($22,000 win bonus) def. Charles Oliveira: $12,000
Duane Ludwig: $32,000 ($16,000 win bonus) def. Amir Sadollah: $20,000
Jared Hamman: $24,000 ($12,000 win bonus) def. C.B. Dollaway: $20,000
Joseph Benavidez: $43,000 ($21,500 win bonus) def. Eddie Wineland: $10,000
Ed Herman: $52,000 ($26,000 win bonus) def. Kyle Noke: $8,000
Ronny Markes: $16,000 ($8,000 win bonus) def. Karlos Vemola: $10,000
Jim Hettes: $12,000 ($6,000 win bonus) def. Alex Caceres: $8,000
Cole Miler: $34,000 ($17,000 win bonus) def. T.J. O'Brien: $6,000
Jacob Volkmann: $28,000 ($14,000 win bonus) def. Danny Castillo: $17,000
Edwin Figueroa: $12,000 ($6,000 win bonus) def. Jason Reinhardt: $6,000

See also
List of UFC events

References

External links
Official UFC website

UFC on Versus
2011 in mixed martial arts
Mixed martial arts in Wisconsin
Sports competitions in Milwaukee
2011 in sports in Wisconsin
Events in Milwaukee